Ryde or Die Vol. 2 is the second compilation album by American hip hop collective and record label Ruff Ryders. It was originally scheduled for release on March 7, 2000, but was delayed to July 4, 2000 and released via Interscope Records. Recording sessions took place at Chung King Studios, Sony Music Studios, Battery Studios, Powerhouse Studios in New York City, at the Record Plant, the Enterprise, Westlake Audio in Los Angeles, at the Hit Factory Criteria in Miami. Production was handled by Swizz Beatz, Mahogany, Teflon, Icepick, P. Killer Trackz and TJ Beatz, with Darrin Dean, Joaquin Dean, Chivon Dean and Leota Blacknor serving as executive producers. It features guest appearances from Busta Rhymes, Method Man & Redman, Scarface, Snoop Dogg, Trick Daddy and Twista.

The album debuted at number two on Billboard 200, selling 254,000 copies in its first week in stores and was certified Platinum by the Recording Industry Association of America on August 18, 2000.

Track listing

Samples
Track 4 embodies an interpolation from "I'm Holding You Responsible" written by George Clinton and Eddie Hazel
Track 16 embodies an interpolation from "Yearning for Your Love" written by Oliver Scott and Ronnie Wilson

Charts

Weekly charts

Year-end charts

Certifications

References

External links

Sequel albums
2000 compilation albums
Albums produced by Swizz Beatz
Gangsta rap compilation albums
Record label compilation albums
Albums recorded at Chung King Studios
East Coast hip hop compilation albums
Ruff Ryders Entertainment compilation albums